This is a list of minority leaders of the Georgia House of Representatives

minority leaders
G